OPhone, or OMS (Open Mobile System), is a mobile operating system running on the Linux kernel. It is based on technologies initially developed by Android Inc., a firm later purchased by Google, and work done by the Open Handset Alliance. The OPhone OS has appeared only on China Mobile phones, and the software was developed for China Mobile by software firm Borqs. A modified version of OMS has appeared on other carriers as Android+, also developed and maintained by Borqs. Android has been modified for local Chinese markets by China Mobile's OPhone Software Developers Network.

History 
OPhone is a Linux-based smartphone software platform developed by China Mobile and based on the Android operating system developed by Google. OPhone is based on open source software and mobile internet technologies. For end-users, OPhone aims to provide cheap, low frills, entry-level smartphone access and a limited mobile internet experience using China Mobile's proprietary TD-SCDMA network, and its GSM network.

Software development 
China Mobile consecutively released the 1.0 and 1.5 versions of the OPhone SDK for public use.

In February 2010, China Mobile released the 2.0 version of the SDK for public use. According to a Sina Tech release, this iteration would include support for the Windows Mobile API framework.

As of April 2010 around 600 apps had been developed specifically for OPhones.

See also 
 Android (operating system)
 Baidu Yi
 Borqs
 Google Nexus
 WebOS

References

External links 
 China Mobile Home Page
 OPhone Software Developers Network: Ophone 1.5 SDK
 China Mobile Close To Launching Android Based 3G Phone  Moco News.net (January 9, 2009)
 China Mobile Ophone hopes China Daily (September 1, 2009)
 China Mobile's OMS 2.0 Android OS supports Windows Mobile APIs. What's that? Mobile Tech World (February 2, 2010)
 China Mobile Backed OS Meant to Rival iPhone Falls Into Obscurity Cio (June 19, 2012)

Smartphone operating systems
Embedded Linux
Mobile Linux
Cloud clients
Mobile operating systems
Free mobile software
Android (operating system)